"Stay Together for the Kids" is a song recorded by American rock band Blink-182 for their fourth studio album, Take Off Your Pants and Jacket (2001). It was released as the third and final single from the album on February 19, 2002. The track was composed primarily by guitarist Tom DeLonge, who based its lyrics on his parents' divorce and its effect on him.

The song's original music video, directed by Samuel Bayer, depicts the band performing in a home being destroyed by a wrecking ball in a metaphor for divorce. The clip was re-shot following the 9/11 attacks, with both the band and label deeming its imagery too similar to the collapse of the World Trade Center.

The song received positive reviews from contemporary music critics, with many praising its tone and subject matter. It was a hit on rock radio in the United States, where it peaked at number seven on the Modern Rock Tracks chart in 2001.

Background

"Stay Together for the Kids" is written about divorce from the point of view of a helpless child. Its heavier sound was inspired by bands the group's members were listening to in the two weeks they wrote their fourth album, Take Off Your Pants and Jacket, such as Fugazi and Refused. Primarily written by guitarist Tom DeLonge, the song is biographical in nature. He and bassist Mark Hoppus were growing up when their respective parents divorced. For Hoppus, he was eight years old when he was sent to live with his father. "The thing you realize as you get older is that parents don’t know what the hell they’re doing and neither will you when you get to be a parent. You’ve just got to understand that people are human and they make mistakes," he said. DeLonge remembered learning of his parents' divorce when he discovered scrape marks on the driveway of their home. "Right then, I knew my dad had dragged out his furniture single-handedly," he recalled. He spoke on the song's inspiration in 2001:

Due to its tone and subject matter, it is considered one of the band's darker songs, alongside "Adam's Song", their 2000 single revolving around suicide. Hoppus told an interviewer at the time of the album's release that "There's always a song or two where we really try to really push ourselves [...] On this new record I think we've done a lot of different stuff that people wouldn't ever expect from us. [...] On the new one, it's 'Stay Together for the Kids.'" DeLonge later confirmed he had received emails from fans thanking him for the song's message. "With "Stay Together", we get emails—just kid after kid after kid—saying, 'I know exactly what you're talking about! That song is about my life!'" In 2002, divorce statistics were four times higher than their average just over thirty years prior, with over 50 percent of marriages ending in divorce. "You look at statistics that 50 percent of parents get divorced, and you’re going to get a pretty large group of kids who are pissed off and who don’t agree with what their parents have done," said DeLonge. "Stay Together" was the final song completed during the recording sessions; it was created one day before the album was handed off to the mixing engineer.

Composition
"Stay Together for the Kids" is set in the time signature of common time, with a tempo of 72 beats per minute. It is composed in the key of D major with vocals spanning the tonal nodes of A3 to B5. Hoppus and DeLonge split vocals on the song, with the former handling verses and the latter singing the choruses. In the verses, the lyrics detail a marriage gone awry: "Rather than fix the problems/They never solve them/It makes no sense at all." The song fades out with DeLonge singing "It’s not right."

Commercial performance
"Stay Together for the Kids" was released as a single and EP with live tracks and video extras. It debuted on Billboard Modern Rock Tracks chart in the issue dated September 22, 2001 at number 36, before gradually rising to a peak of position seven in the issue dated November 24, 2001. The single spent 26 weeks on the chart as a whole, before appearing in the issue dated March 16, 2002. It also peaked at number 16 and spent five weeks on the Bubbling Under Hot 100 Singles chart, which documents top singles that have yet to chart on the main chart, the Billboard Hot 100. By June 2002, the song had accumulated over 80,000 spins on radio in the United States, and it received a BDS Certified Spin Award. Outside of the US, the song charted in Germany, where it reached a peak of 73.

Reception
"Stay Together for the Kids" received positive reviews from contemporary music critics. Rob Sheffield of Rolling Stone deemed the song "bleak," describing it as a "broken-family snapshot." Eric Aiese of Billboard wrote that the song "remains compelling throughout," suggesting it could be a "MacArthur Park" or "Hey Jude" within the band’s catalogue. Slant Magazine's Aaron Scott called it "the best track on the album," writing, "The surprising content about a marriage that is resisting divorce will certainly appeal to a generation of youth subjected to a massive divorce epidemic. Blink hints at something here, but resists saying anything concrete."

John J. Miller of the National Review included the song at number 17 in "Rockin' the Right: The 50 Greatest Conservative Rock Songs", describing it as "a eulogy for family values by an alt-rock band whose members were raised in a generation without enough of them".

William Shaw of Blender compared the song to then-popular songs by rock bands about divorce, such as Papa Roach ("Broken Home"), Staind ("For You") and Nickelback ("Too Bad"), commenting, "The ’90s had Generation X — have we ended up with Generation Whine?" He interviewed DeLonge, who remarked in response to divorce's effect on children, "Is this a damaged generation? Yeah, I’d say so."

Music video
The first music video for "Stay Together for the Kids" was directed by Samuel Bayer, best known for his work with Metallica and Nirvana. In the clip, Blink-182 perform in a suburban home that is destroyed with a wrecking ball in a metaphor for a "crumbling marriage." The video opens with a statistic, claiming that "50 percent of American households are destroyed by divorce."

The band filmed the music video on September 9–10, 2001 in Los Angeles, in days preceding the 9/11 terrorist attacks. Following those events, the band and its label MCA felt the clip’s images were "too evocative" of the footage of the collapse of the World Trade Center. The band ended up recording a second video for this song with the same production crew, with the setting changed to an empty mansion populated by shouting teens.

The two videos were first released on The Urethra Chronicles II: Harder Faster Faster Harder, a 2002 home video on the band. The first video has since widely become available online on sites like YouTube.

Cover versions
The song is played on acoustic guitar by a soldier in the War in Afghanistan near the end of the film Restrepo (2010).

Track listing

Charts

References

Footnotes

Sources

External links

2001 songs
2002 singles
Blink-182 songs
Emo songs
MCA Records singles
Music videos directed by Samuel Bayer
Rock ballads
Songs about marriage
Songs written by Mark Hoppus
Songs written by Tom DeLonge
Songs written by Travis Barker
Songs about divorce
Songs about children